The cycling competition at the 1948 Summer Olympics in London consisted of two road cycling events and four track cycling events, all for men only. The track cycling events were held at the Herne Hill Velodrome in south London. The road race events were held in Windsor Great Park, south of Windsor.

Medal summary

Road cycling

Track cycling

Participating nations

188 cyclists from 33 nations competed.

Medal table

References

External links
Official Olympic Report

 
1948 Summer Olympics events
1948
Cycle racing in London
1948 in road cycling
1948 in track cycling
1948 in cycle racing
Cycling competitions in the United Kingdom